Rock Creek is a stream in Jackson County in the U.S. state of Missouri. It is a tributary of the Missouri River.

Rock Creek was named for the rocks within its course.

See also
List of rivers of Missouri

References

Rivers of Jackson County, Missouri
Rivers of Missouri